Calicium quercinum is a species of lichen belonging to the family Caliciaceae.

It is native to Europe and Northern America.

References

quercinum
Lichen species
Lichens described in 1797
Lichens of Europe
Lichens of North America
Taxa named by Christiaan Hendrik Persoon